Rotax is the brand name for a range of internal combustion engines developed and manufactured by the Austrian company BRP-Rotax GmbH & Co KG (until 2016 BRP-Powertrain GmbH & Co. KG), in turn owned by the Canadian Bombardier Recreational Products.

Rotax four-stroke and advanced two-stroke engines are used in a wide variety of small land, sea and airborne vehicles. Bombardier Recreational Products (BRP) use them in their own range of such vehicles. In the light aircraft class, in 1998 Rotax outsold all other aero engine manufacturers combined.

History 
The company was founded in 1920 in Dresden, Germany, as ROTAX-WERK AG. In 1930, it was taken over by Fichtel & Sachs and transferred its operations to Schweinfurt, Germany.
Operations were moved to Wels, Austria, in 1943 and finally to Gunskirchen, Austria, in 1947. In 1959, the majority of Rotax shares were taken over by the Vienna-based Lohner-Werke, a manufacturer of car and railway wagon bodies.

In 1970, Lohner-Rotax was bought by the Canadian Bombardier Inc. The former Bombardier branch, Bombardier Recreational Products, now an independent company, uses Rotax engines in its ground vehicles, personal water craft, and snowmobiles.

Applications

Snowmobiles 
Ski-Doo snowmobiles from Bombardier Recreational Products are equipped with Rotax engines, including two-stroke and four-stroke, turbocharged and naturally aspirated, two- and three-cylinder models.

Aircraft 
Rotax supplies aircraft engines for ultralight aircraft, light aircraft and unmanned aerial vehicles.

Motorcycles 
The Can-Am division of Bombardier Inc. developed a line of motorcycles starting in 1971, powered by Rotax engines. The Can-Am motorcycle operation was outsourced to Armstrong-CCM Motorcycles in 1983, with production ending in 1987.

Motorcycle manufacturers using Rotax engines, either Rotax-branded or branded for the OEM, include Aprilia, BMW (F and G series), Buell and KTM.

Can-Am resumed motorcycle production with a series of on-road three-wheel motorcycles, starting with the Spyder, using Rotax engines. As of 2020, there are three models: the Ryker uses the 2-cylinder 600 ACE and 3-cylinder 900 ACE, the Spyder F3 and the Spyder RT use the 3-cylinder 1330 ACE.

Personal watercraft 
As of 2020, all Sea-Doo brand personal watercraft from Bombardier Recreational Products are equipped with four-stroke, supercharged and normally aspirated, three-cylinder Rotax engines of the ACE (Advanced Combustion Efficiency) series.

Off-road vehicles 
Can-Am Off-Road vehicles from Bombardier Recreational Products are equipped with Rotax engines.

Karting 
The company introduced the Rotax Max for karting in 1998, and started organizing the Rotax Max Challenge in 2000. It also introduced the Mojo karting tyres in 2006 and the XPS lubricants in 2010.

Products

Aircraft engines 

Rotax engines designed specifically for light aircraft include both four-stroke and two-stroke models. 

Current models are:
 Rotax 912 series, four-stroke
 Rotax 914 series, four-stroke
 Rotax 915 series, four-stroke

Historical models no longer in production include:
 Rotax 275, two-stroke
 Rotax 277, two-stroke
 Rotax 377, two-stroke
 Rotax 447 UL, two-stroke
 Rotax 503 UL, two-stroke
 Rotax 532 UL, two-stroke
 Rotax 535 certified two-stroke
 Rotax 582 UL, two-stroke
 Rotax 618 UL, two-stroke

Karting engines
The Rotax MAX engine karting engine is a two-stroke engine series, launched in 1997.

OEM
The company also produces unbranded engines, parts and complete powertrains for Original Equipment Manufacturers (OEM). Uses include motor bikes and scooters, with complete engines including the Rotax 122 and Rotax 804.

References

External links

Official Website
Rotax Aircraft Engines
List of Rotax engines applied to new-build aircraft

Aircraft engine manufacturers of Austria
Bombardier Recreational Products
Manufacturing companies established in 1920
Kart manufacturers
Motorcycle engine manufacturers
Motorcycle manufacturers of Austria
Two-stroke gasoline engines
Automotive motorsports and performance companies
Austrian brands
1920 establishments in Germany
Engine manufacturers of Austria
Economy of Upper Austria